The fourth series of Warsaw Shore, a Polish television programme based in Warsaw was confirmed on 13 July 2015. The show began on 11 October 2015. This is the first series not to include original cast members Paweł Cattaneo and Ewelina Kubiak, who leaves at the end of the previous series. This series marks the return of Jakub Henke as main cast member. Ahead of the series it was confirmed that the series would be filmed in a Polish seaside town Łeba. This was the final series to include cast member Alan Kwieciński.

Cast
Alan Kwieciński
Anna Ryśnik
Damian Zduńczyk
Jakub Henke
Klaudia Stec
Magda Pyznar
Anna "Mała" Aleksandrzak
Wojciech Gola

Duration of cast

Notes 

 Key:  = "Cast member" is featured in this episode.
 Key:  = "Cast member" voluntarily leaves the house.
 Key:  = "Cast member" leaves and returns to the house in the same episode.
 Key:  = "Cast member" returns to the house.
 Key:  = "Cast member" leaves the series.
 Key:  = "Cast member" returns to the series.

Episodes

References 

2015 Polish television seasons
Summer Camp
2016 Polish television seasons